2019–20 Iran Football's 2nd Division  is the 19th under 2nd Division since its establishment (current format) in 2001. The season featured 21 teams from the 2nd Division 2018–19, one new team relegated from the 2018–19 Azadegan League: Shahrdari Mahshahr, and six new teams promoted from the 3rd Division 2018–19: Shahrdari Astara, Melli Haffari Ahvaz, Esteghlal Molasani, Milad Mehr Iranian Tehran, Darayi Bandar Gaz, Shohadaye Razakan Karaj.
These changes has been applied before the season:

After concerns about COVID-19 pandemic in Iran the matches has been postponed at 1 March 2020.

Teams

Stadia and locations

Number of teams by region

League table

Group A

Group B

2nd Division  Play-off

Leg 1

Leg 2 

source=

2nd Division  Final

Leg 1

Notes

References

League 2 (Iran) seasons
3